Villa Basilica is a comune (municipality) in the Province of Lucca in the Italian region Tuscany, located about  northwest of Florence and about  northeast of Lucca.

Villa Basilica borders the following municipalities: Bagni di Lucca, Borgo a Mozzano, Capannori, Pescia.

Notable people
 Pietro Perna  (1519–1582), printer and humanist
 Sisto Fabri (1540–1594), theologian

References

Cities and towns in Tuscany